Matthew Evan Corcoran (born 28 July 1964) is an American former federal prosecutor who became a white-collar crime defense attorney and who gained prominence due to his role in the FBI investigation into Donald Trump's handling of government documents as Donald Trump's attorney.

Early life 
Corcoran was born on July 28, 1964 to Thomas J. Corcoran, a four terms U.S. Representative from Illinois and Helenmarie A. Corcoran.

After graduating from a local high school, Evan attended Princeton University and graduated with an Bachelor's degree in politics in 1986. Eventually, he got a Juris Doctor from Georgetown University Law Center in 1991.

Early career 
In 1987 he became the assistant of a ranking member of a House of Representative subcommittee. In 1992 he was appointed as an Assistant U.S. Attorney and served for eight years until 2000. In that capacity he tried more than 30 jury trials, presented 20 appellate oral arguments, and investigated a number of criminal matters. He then spent 15 years at a Washington, DC based law firm before he joined the Baltimore law form Silvermore, Thompson, Slutkin & White. Among his representations were a trial counsel for an insurer in a $4 billion insurance coverage case that followed the destruction of the World Trade Center, a government contract litigation in which he represented Computer Sciences Corporation, a lead counsel for the Audit Committee of the largest US pharmaceutical care company, a class action litigation in Hawaii in which he defended Verizon, and an antitrust case where he represented T-Mobile in a civil lawsuit accompanying the US DOJ action to enjoin its merger with AT&T.

Corcoran had been a law school friend of Tim Shea, a top Trump-era Justice Department official whom then-Attorney General William Barr had appointed as the acting US attorney in Washington, and in early 2020 Corcoran nearly became the second-ranking official in the federal prosecutor's office under Shea but this came to naught when Shea was forced out of office amid outcry over the Justice Department leadership's interventions in the prosecutions of Roger Stone and former Trump national security advisor Michael Flynn.

Corcoran then defended Steve Bannon in his contempt of Congress case that ended in Bannon being found guilty of the charges brought against him. Corcoran also defended a Pennsylvania man who pleaded guilty to participating in the January 6 United States Capitol attack.

Trump's Attorney and involvement in the Trump's handling of government documents case 

In April 2022 Corcoran joined the defense team of Donald Trump, according to a Washington Post report without Trump ever having met him before. According to the report he was introduced to the team via a conference call by another Trump advisor. 

The National Archives (NARA) had informed Trump representatives in May 2021 that they were missing a number of documents and in December 2021 Trump's lawyers had informed the National Archives that they had found 12 boxes of documents at Mar-a-Lago, Trump's Florida residence. On April 12, 2022, NARA said it would let the FBI access the documents retrieved from Mar-a-Lago. Trump's lawyers sought to delay this outcome. On May 10, Debra Steidel Wall, the acting Archivist of the United States, wrote Corcoran to reiterate that Trump had taken hundreds of pages of classified materials with him, including highly classified Special access programs materials, and that their extended negotiations over alleged executive privilege was delaying investigations and threat assessments already underway. She said that based on legal counsel she had decided not to honor their request for further delays. On May 11, the DOJ subpoenaed Trump for "any and all documents or writings in the custody or control of Donald J. Trump and/or the Office of Donald J. Trump bearing classification markings". Trump's advisers repeatedly urged him to fully comply with the subpoena, despite his desire to keep some documents. 

On May 12, the DOJ issued a grand jury subpoena to the National Archives for the classified documents they had provided to the House select committee investigating the January 6 United States Capitol attack. In a letter to the DOJ dated May 25 Corcoran argued against proceeding with a criminal investigation, saying that presidents have the "absolute authority" to declassify documents, although he did not clarify whether Trump had done so. This letter was published by the DOJ alongside the affidavit of the search warrant for the August 8 search.

Investigators from the DOJ and the FBI met with Trump's attorneys at Mar-a-Lago on June 3 about the classified material that was subpoenaed on May 11. During this meeting, Trump's custodian of records, Christina Bobb, gave the DOJ a signed declaration that had been drafted by Corcoran, attesting that all classified material had been returned. Two months later, after the falsehood came to light, The New York Times reported that the signed declaration possibly indicated that Trump's legal team had not been forthright with federal investigators about the material. 

On August 8, 2022, the FBI executed a search warrant at Mar-a-Lago, seizing over 13,000 government documents.

In January 2023, Corcoran appeared before a grand jury and testified for about four hours, but he invoked Attorney–client privilege to avoid answering certain questions about his conversations with Trump. Special counsel Jack Smith in turn asked federal judge Beryl Howell in February to invoke the Crime-fraud exception, arguing that Corcoran is not protected by attorney-client privilege because his discussions with Trump may have been conducted to commit or further a crime. On March 17, Howell ruled that DOJ had justified the crime-fraud exception, and she ordered Corcoran to testify again.

References 

Assistant United States Attorneys
Princeton University alumni
Living people
Maryland lawyers
1964 births
Donald Trump litigation
Georgetown University Law Center alumni